David Lee Russell Walter (born December 9, 1964) is a former American football quarterback in the National Football League. He played for the Cincinnati Bengals. He played college football for the Michigan Tech Huskies. Walter has three children, David, Jessica, and Rebekah.

References

1964 births
Living people
American football quarterbacks
Cincinnati Bengals players
Michigan Tech Huskies football players
People from West Branch, Michigan
Players of American football from Michigan